David Cherry may refer to:

 David A. Cherry (born 1949), American artist, author, and illustrator
 David Cherry (rugby union) (born 1991), Scottish rugby union player